Wobine J.L. Buijs-Glaudemans (born 8 August 1960 in Tilburg) is a Dutch politician from the People's Party for Freedom and Democracy.

From 2003 to 2007, she was a member of the provincial states of North Brabant. In 2011, she was elected as mayor of Oss.

References 
 

1960 births
Living people
Dutch civil servants
Members of the Provincial Council of North Brabant
Members of the People's Party for Freedom and Democracy
People from Oss
People from Tilburg
Women mayors of places in the Netherlands